Hall Place may refer to:

 Hall Place, Grade I listed building, London Borough of Bexley, England
 Hall Place Estate, Westminster, housing estate in Westminster
 Hall Place (Bentworth), Grade II listed building, Hampshire, England
 Hall Place (Manhattan), the former name of Taras Shevchenko Place, a street in Manhattan, New York City, United States.
 Hall Place now known as Oakley Hall, Hampshire, Georgian manor at Oakley near Basingstoke, England.

Architectural disambiguation pages